The 2017–18 Albany Great Danes men's basketball team represented the University at Albany, SUNY during the 2017–18 NCAA Division I men's basketball season. The Great Danes, led by 17th-year head coach Will Brown, played their home games at SEFCU Arena as members of the America East Conference. They finished the season 22–10, 10–6 in America East play to finish in fourth place. They lost to Stony Brook in the quarterfinals of the America East tournament. Despite having 22 wins, they opted to not play in a postseason tournament.

Previous season
The Great Danes finished the 2016–17 season 21–14, 10–6 in America East play to finish in a tie for third place. As the No. 3 seed in the America East tournament, they defeated Hartford and Stony Brook to advance to the championship game where they lost to Vermont. They were invited to the CollegeInsider.com Postseason Tournament where they lost in the first round to Saint Peter's.

Offseason

Departures

Incoming transfers

2017 incoming recruits

2018 incoming recruits

Preseason 
In a poll by the conference’s nine head coaches (who were not allowed to pick their own team) at the America East media day, the Great Danes were picked to finish in second place in the America East. Juniors David Nichols and Joe Cremo were named to the preseason All-America East team.

Roster

Schedule and results

|-
!colspan=9 style=|Exhibition

|-
!colspan=12 style=|Non-conference regular season

|-
!colspan=12 style=| American East regular season

|-
!colspan=12 style=| America East tournament

References

Albany Great Danes men's basketball seasons
Albany
Albany Great Danes men's basketball
Albany Great Danes men's basketball